Victor Sanchez Union Field (formerly Toledo Union Field) is a football stadium in Punta Gorda, Toledo, Belize. It is the home stadium for Freedom Fighters of the Premier League of Belize.

References

Belize Premier Football League home stadiums
Event venues with year of establishment missing
Toledo District